The 1991–92 season was the 58th Tercera División season from its creation in 1929. The competition was played through a 17 groups of 20 teams each. The top four teams of every group played the Segunda División B play-off, while the last three or four teams of every groups were relegated to Divisions regionals.

The season 1991–92 of Tercera División of Spanish football started August 1991 and ended May 1992.

Group I

Group II

Group III

Group IV

Group V

Group VI

North

South

Group VII

Group VIII

Group IX

Group X

Group XI

Group XII

Group XIII

Group XIV

Group XV

Group XVI

Group XVII

Notes

External links
AREFE

 
Tercera División seasons
4
Spain